"The Junction" is the second segment of the thirty-second episode and the fourteenth episode of the second season (1986–87) of the television series The Twilight Zone. In this segment, two miners are trapped in a section of mine which exists simultaneously in the years 1912 and 1986.

Plot
Miner John Parker is kicked out of his house after his wife Melissa catches him having an extramarital affair. At work, John reports to the junction, which has not been productive in years. The team gets lost and a cave-in traps John. After the dust settles, John hears a voice and finds another trapped miner, Ray, with a broken leg. Ray is inquisitive about John's digital watch and the flashlight on his helmet. When Ray mentions his birth year and age, John realizes that Ray believes the date is September 16, 1912. After John unsuccessfully looks for a route to dig themselves out, Ray and John start talking about their families and lives.

A reverend gives a letter to Melissa that has been at his church for 60 years and was supposed to be delivered to her on September 15, 1986 - the day before. The letter, signed by Ray, warns Melissa what was going to happen to John and tells her not to let him go to the mine. It also asks her to forgive John for his extramarital affair. She goes to the mine foreman and pleads with him to look for John in the location mentioned in the letter.

Ray and John both hear approaching rescue parties.  Ray is saved by a party from 1912. He tries to get help for John, only to be told he was the only one missing. Ray gets his wife to help him write the letter to send to Melissa. The miners come up with John in the present. The Parkers reunite in a loving embrace and go home together.

External links
 

1987 American television episodes
The Twilight Zone (1985 TV series season 2) episodes
Television episodes about time travel
Fiction set in 1912
Fiction set in 1986
Works about mining

fr:Le Futur antérieur